Abraham Villon (born March 13, 1990) is an American professional soccer player who plays as a midfielder for Los Angeles Force in the National Independent Soccer Association.

Career

Early career
Villon played college soccer at Arizona Western College and San Diego State University between 2009 and 2013. While at college he also appeared for USL PDL clubs Orange County Blue Star in 2009, Ventura County Fusion in 2010 and 2011 and Thunder Bay Chill in 2012 and 2013.

Professional
Villon signed his first professional contract with USL Pro club Oklahoma City Energy on April 5, 2014.

In 2017, Villon signed with the Thunder Bay Chill in the Premier Development League.  Following that season in October, Villon returned to Southern California where he joined California United FC II and was a leading contributor to the clubs 2018 United Premier Soccer League's Fall Season National Championship team, being named the 2018 Fall Season Most Valuable Player.

In August 2019, Villon was signed by United's professional team, California United Strikers FC, ahead of its inaugural season in the National Independent Soccer Association.

In December 2020, Villon joined Los Angeles Force ahead of the 2021 season.

References

1990 births
Living people
American soccer players
American expatriate soccer players
San Diego State Aztecs men's soccer players
Orange County Blue Star players
Ventura County Fusion players
Thunder Bay Chill players
OKC Energy FC players
California United Strikers FC players
Los Angeles Force players
Association football midfielders
Soccer players from California
Expatriate soccer players in Canada
USL League Two players
USL Championship players
United States men's youth international soccer players
Sportspeople from Orange County, California
People from Garden Grove, California
Arizona Western Matadors men's soccer players
United Premier Soccer League players
National Independent Soccer Association players